René Flèche was a French sprint canoer who competed in the late 1940s. He finished 12th in the K-2 10000 m event at the 1948 Summer Olympics in London.

References
Sports-reference.com profile

External links

Canoeists at the 1948 Summer Olympics
French male canoeists
Olympic canoeists of France
Year of birth missing
Possibly living people